The One Lamb is a 2009 American Christian film directed by Bryan Forrest, set to be released on March 30, 2009. It stars John W. Price, Alyson Lowe, Anna Holmes and Bryan Forrest. It is unrated. It was financed by University City United Methodist Church, in North Carolina.

Plot 
The One Lamb is the story of Jackson Price (Bryan Forrest) who is diagnosed with cancer, and determined to atone for the sins of his past. He once had everything going his way, but in a moment of weakness he lost everything. He was abandoned by his wife, learns he is dying of cancer, and may not live long. But he's determined to fight, and with a little help from a pastor named Earl (John W. Price), he tries to achieve redemption for his past failures while hoping and praying for a happy, healthy future.

References

External links 
 
 
 The One Lamb at Allmovie

2009 films
Films about evangelicalism
2009 drama films
American drama films
2000s English-language films
2000s American films